M/V Rip Van Winkle is a Hudson River tour boat based in Kingston, New York. She was built for use in the oil industry in 1980, but has served as a passenger vessel in New York State, and as a ferry for the US Navy.

Tours
The boat leaves Kingston's Rondout Creek, heads south down to Hyde Park, New York, and then turns north and returns to Kingston. The total time is 2 hours and the trip is narrated. Sightseeing tours have also included "three-hour narrated tours to the Vanderbilt estate, in Hyde Park." Rip Van Winkle also offers various specialty cruises throughout the year, such as music cruises and murder mystery dinner party cruises, and can be chartered for parties and weddings.

History 
Rip Van Winkle was built to be an oil industry shore well platform service vessel, by Edward T. Gamage in East Boothbay, Maine in 1980. She was purchased by Charles Robertson, owner of the New England Steamboat lines, who converted the boat to passenger service. An upper deck was added as were lavatories, snack bar and liquid bar. She was put into service in 1982 out of Haddam CT to Greenport and Sag Harbor, Long Island as the "Yankee Clipper."  During her time with the New England Steamboat lines, the vessel was contracted in service to the Navy as a ferry boat for the sailors in New London. Hudson River Cruises bought the boat in 1985 and brought it to Kingston, New York in September of that year. Rip van Winkle went into service on the Hudson River in 1986.

References

External links

See also
Rip Van Winkle (disambiguation)

Boats
Tourist attractions in Ulster County, New York
Kingston, New York
1980 ships